The Ulster Star is a newspaper based in Lisburn, County Antrim, Northern Ireland, UK. It is published by a holding company titled Johnston Publishing (NI), part of Johnston Press. Among its photographers were John Kelly, who died in 2019.

References

External links
 Official website

Newspapers published in Northern Ireland
Mass media in County Antrim
Lisburn
Newspapers published by Johnston Press